Olajuwon Noah (born 28 December 1989) is a Samoan rugby union player who plays for the  in the United Rugby Championship. His playing position is flanker. Noah joined the Sharks ahead of the 2021–22 United Rugby Championship, having previously played semi-professionally in the Shute Shield for NHRU Wildfires. In 2021, Noah won his first caps for Samoa in their 2023 Rugby World Cup qualifiers against Tonga.

Reference list

External links
itsrugby.co.uk profile

1989 births
Samoan rugby union players
Samoa international rugby union players
Living people
Rugby union flankers
Melbourne Rising players
Canberra Vikings players
Sharks (rugby union) players
Sharks (Currie Cup) players
Aviron Bayonnais players